Itapipoca is a city in Ceará, Brazil. It was founded in 1823.

Education

Higher Education
 National University of Theology of Brazil (Portuguese: Universidade Nacional de Teologia do Brasil or UTEB)
 Jeová Rafá Theological Institute (Portuguese: Instituto Teológico Jeová Rafá)

Notable people
Tiririca - entertainer and politician

References

Populated coastal places in Ceará
Municipalities in Ceará